A jùn (郡) was a historical administrative division of China from the Eastern Zhou (c. 7th century BCE) until the early Tang dynasty (c. 7th century CE). It is usually translated as a commandery.

Countries around China have adopted administrative divisions based on or named after the jùn.

History and development

China

Eastern Zhou
During the Eastern Zhou's Spring and Autumn period from the 8th to 5th centuries BCE, the larger and more powerful of the Zhou's vassal states—including Qin, Jin and Wei—began annexing their smaller rivals. These new lands were not part of their original fiefs and were instead organized into counties (xiàn). Eventually, jun were developed as marchlands between the major realms. Despite having smaller populations and ranking lower on the official hierarchies, the jun were larger and boasted greater military strength than the counties.

As each state's territory gradually took shape in the 5th- to 3rd-century BCE Warring States period, the jun at the borders flourished. This gave rise to a two-tier administrative system, with counties subordinate to jun. Each of the states' territories was by now comparatively larger, hence there was no need for the military might of a jun in the inner regions where counties were established. The border jun's military and strategic significance became more important than those of counties.

Qin dynasty
Following the unification of China in 221 BCE under the Qin Empire, the Qin government still had to engage in military activity because there were rebels from among the six former states who were unwilling to submit to Qin rule. As a result, the First Emperor set up 36 jun in the Qin Empire, each subdivided into counties. This established the first two-tier administrative system known to exist in China.

Han dynasty and Three Kingdoms period

When the Han dynasty triumphed over Chu in 206 BCE, the Zhou feudal system was initially reinstated, with Emperor Gao recognizing nearly independent kings and granting large territories to his relatives. These two sets of kingdoms were placed under hereditary rulers assisted by a chancellor (xiàng). Parallel to these, some Qin jun were continued, placed under a governor appointed directly by the central government.

By the Eastern Han dynasty, the jun were subordinated to a new division, the province (zhōu). — establishing a three-tier system composed of provinces (zhou), commanderies (jun), and counties (xian). Based upon legendary accounts of the Yellow Emperor's Nine Provinces which were geographic rather than formal political areas, there were initially 13 zhōu and roughly 100 jun.

Jin dynasty and the Southern and Northern Dynasties
China was greatly divided during the following five centuries, during the Jin and Northern and Southern Dynasties period. The number of administrative units drastically increased due to intense warfare, fluid political boundaries, forced migrations, widespread population loss, and the loss of central government control in many areas particularly during the Sixteen Kingdoms. Although the legacy three-tier system was still in formal effect, rulers of various kingdoms had defined and re-defined provinces until they became increasingly sub-divided, blurring the distinction between provinces (zhou) and commanderies (jun) and reflecting the chaos of China at the time.

Sui and Tang dynasties
China was finally re-united by Emperor Wen of the Sui (581–618) in 589. As there were already over 100 provinces, the province and commandery levels of the administration were merged into one level, typically rendered in English as prefecture, marking the end of the commandery. Some Emperors preferred "jun" to refer to this level of administration, but most used "zhou" and the political function was the same, regardless. By the end of the Tang Dynasty the term jun saw no more use in China (and a new higher tier of administrative unit, the circuit (dao) had been introduced, bringing back a three-tier system).

Taiwan (1920–1945)

During 1920–1945, when Taiwan was under Japanese rule, there were divisions called 郡 (Mandarin: jùn, Japanese: gun). They are based on the Districts of Japan (郡 gun), which in turn were based on ancient Chinese jùn. Their officers were known as 郡守 (Mandarin: jùnshǒu, Japanese: gunshu). This was the title of ancient administrators of the Chinese jun (see below), and had never existed in Japan. By the end of 1945, there were 51 jun/kun in Taiwan.

Administrative hierarchy
In the Warring States period, the chief administrative officers of the areas were known as jun administrators (literally "defender of the jun"). In the Han dynasty, the position of junshou was renamed grand administrator (. "Grand Defender"). Both terms are also translated as "governor". A grand administrator drew an annual salary of 2,000 dan of grain according to the pinzhi (pǐnzhì) system of administrative rank. Many former grand administrators were promoted to the posts of the Three Ducal Ministers or Nine Ministers later in their careers.

Other uses 
In contemporary Chinese language, the word   is also used to translate the administrative division Shire in English language. The counties of the United Kingdom and the United States are also translated as jùn.

See also
 Zhou, also translated as prefecture, and often poetically referred to as jun after Tang dynasty, alluding to its historical equivalents
 Fu, also translated as prefecture, and often poetically referred to as jun in the Ming dynasty and Qing dynasty
 Government of the Han dynasty
 , for administrative divisions in other countries that are also called . All of them were based on or inspired by the ancient Chinese jun, but their nature have become quite different from the original concept.

References

Citations

Bibliography
 Sima Qian. Records of the Grand Historian (Shi Ji).

 01
Administrative divisions of ancient China
Former administrative divisions of China
History of Imperial China